Amynilyspes is an extinct genus of pill millipedes characterized by fourteen tergites, large eyes, and prominent spines.

References

Millipede genera
Carboniferous myriapods
Prehistoric myriapod genera
Taxa named by Samuel Hubbard Scudder
Fossil taxa described in 1882
Paleozoic life of Nova Scotia